Lenox Merchants were an American semi-professional basketball team based in Lenox, Massachusetts. Founded in 1949 by William "Butch" Gregory, it regularly played exhibition games against NBA teams. During the 1954–1955 season, the Merchants beat the soon-to-be NBA champions, the Syracuse Nationals, twice, and scored victories against the Minneapolis Lakers and the Milwaukee Hawks.

Notable players
Glenn Bissell
Tom Brennan
John Burke
Gerald Calabrese
Fred Diute
George Feigenbaum
Ray Felix
Billy Harrell
Bob Knight
Francis Mahoney
Al McGuire
Boris Nachamkin
Ronnie Shavlik
Zeke Sinicola
Dick Surhoff
Skippy Whitaker

References

1949 establishments in Massachusetts
1959 disestablishments in Massachusetts
Basketball teams established in 1949
Basketball teams disestablished in 1959
Basketball teams in Massachusetts
Defunct basketball teams in the United States
Lenox, Massachusetts